Taylor Independent School District is a public and private school district based in Taylor, Texas, USA.

In 2009, the school district was rated "academically acceptable" by the Texas Education Agency.

Schools
Taylor High School (grades 9–12; also serves students from the Coupland Independent School District)
Taylor Middle School (grades 6–8)
T.H. Johnson Elementary School (grades PreK-K)
1985-86 National Blue Ribbon School
Naomi Pasemann Elementary School (grades 1–3)
Main Street Intermediate School (grades 4–5)

References

External links
Taylor ISD

School districts in Williamson County, Texas